Vlasyevskaya is a rural locality (a village) in Osinovskoye Rural Settlement of Vinogradovsky District, Arkhangelsk Oblast, Russia. The population was 8 as of 2010.

Geography 
Vlasyevskaya is located on the Severnaya Dvina River, 42 km northwest of Bereznik (the district's administrative centre) by road. Rodionovskaya is the nearest rural locality.

References 

Rural localities in Vinogradovsky District